The Three Great Emperor-Officials are three of the highest Celestial Deities of Taoist religion, and subordinate only to the Jade Emperor  (玉帝yùdì).
The Three Great Emperor-Officials are the Heavenly Official (天官 tiānguān), the Earthly Official (地官 dìguān) and the Water Official (水官 shuǐguān). They administer all phenomenon in the three spheres.

Full Title 
The Heavenly Official, full title: the Heavenly Official of Higher Origin and First-Rank Who Bestows Blessings (上元一品賜福天官, shàngyuán yīpǐn cìfú tiānguān), also known as the Great Emperor of Middle Heaven North Star  (紫微大帝, zǐwēi dàdì)
The Earthly Official, full title: the Earthly Official of Middle Origin and Second-Rank Who Absolve Sins (中元二品赦罪地官, zhōngyuán èrpǐn shèzuì dìguān), also known as the Great Emperor of Pristine Emptiness(清虛大帝, qīnɡxū dàdì)
The Water Official, full title: the Water Official of Lower Origin and Third-Rank Who Eliminate Misfortunes (下元三品解厄水官, xiàyuán sānpǐn jiě è shuǐguān), also known as the Great Emperor of Pervasive Yin (洞陰大帝, dòngyīn dàdì  )

References

External links
 道教文化资料库
  
 神祇列傳-紫微大帝
神祇列傳-三官大帝

Chinese gods
Sky and weather gods
Deities in Taoism